The Kissing Party is an indie rock band from Denver. The
band is composed of Deirdre Sage (vocals), Gregory Dolan (vocals, guitar), Joe Hansen (lead guitar), Lee Evans (bass) and Shane Reid (drums).

The band released The Hate Album in 2009 with Jason Heller of Denver's Westword referring to them as pure among "douchebags and fashion victims."

Discography

Albums
Hold Your Hour And Have Another  (CD; 2006)
Rediscover Lovers (CD; 2007)
The Hate Album  (CD; 2009)
 Waster's Wall (CD; Direct Download; 2011)
Winter In The Pub 2013
 Looking Back It Was Romantic But At The Time I Was Suffocating 2014
Mom and Dad 2019

External links
 The Kissing Party at MySpace
 The Kissing Party at Facebook
 The Denver Post ranks Kissing Party No. 3
 Westword on The Kissing Party

References

Indie rock musical groups from Colorado
Musical groups from Denver